Hannah Lucinda Cifers (born June 26, 1992) is an American mixed martial artist who competes in the strawweight division. She formerly fought in the Ultimate Fighting Championship (UFC).

Mixed martial arts career

Early career 
Cifers made her professional MMA debut in 2013. She fought under various promotions and amassed a record of 8–2 prior to being signed by UFC.

Ultimate Fighting Championship 
Cifers made her promotional debut on November 10, 2018, replacing an injured Maia Stevenson on short notice, at UFC Fight Night: Korean Zombie vs. Rodríguez against Maycee Barber. She lost the fight via technical knockout.

On March 2, 2019, Cifers faced Polyana Viana at UFC 235. She won the fight via split decision.

Cifers faced Jodie Esquibel on August 17, 2019 at UFC 241. She won the fight via unanimous decision.

Cifers was scheduled to face Brianna Van Buren on January 25, 2020 at UFC Fight Night 166. However Van Buren was pulled from the event with undisclosed reason and she was replaced by Angela Hill. She lost the fight via technical knockout in round two.

Cifers was scheduled to face Mackenzie Dern on April 25, 2020. However, on April 9 the promotion announced that the event was postponed. The pairing eventually took place on May 30, 2020 at UFC on ESPN: Woodley vs. Burns. Cifers lost the fight via a kneebar submission in round one.

Cifers made a quick turnaround just two weeks later and faced Mariya Agapova on June 13, 2020 at UFC on ESPN: Eye vs. Calvillo, two weeks after her last contest. She lost the bout via first round submission.

Cifers faced Mallory Martin on August 29, 2020 at UFC Fight Night 175. At the weigh-ins, Cifers weighed in at 117 pounds, one pound over the strawweight non-title fight limit. The bout proceeded at catchweight and she was fined 20 percent of her purse, which went to her opponent Martin. She lost the fight via rear-naked choke in round two.

Cifers was expected to face Emily Whitmire on February 27, 2021 at UFC Fight Night 186. However, Cifers pulled out due to undisclosed reasons and was replaced by Sam Hughes.

Cifers was scheduled to face Melissa Martinez on September 10, 2022 at UFC 279. However, Cifers pulled out of the bout in June for undisclosed reasons.

After the news of her pulling out of the bout, it was announced that she was no longer on the UFC roster.

Mixed martial arts record 

|-
|Loss
|align=center|10–7
|Mallory Martin
|Submission (rear-naked choke)
|UFC Fight Night: Smith vs. Rakić
|
|align=center|2
|align=center|1:33
|Las Vegas, Nevada, United States
|
|-
|Loss
|align=center| 10–6
|Mariya Agapova 
|Submission (rear-naked choke)
|UFC on ESPN: Eye vs. Calvillo
|
|align=center|1
|align=center|2:42
|Las Vegas, Nevada, United States
|
|-
|Loss
|align=center| 10–5
|Mackenzie Dern
|Submission (kneebar)
|UFC on ESPN: Woodley vs. Burns
|
|align=center|1
|align=center|2:36
|Las Vegas, Nevada, United States
|
|-
|Loss
|align=center| 10–4
|Angela Hill
|TKO (elbows and punches)
|UFC Fight Night: Blaydes vs. dos Santos 
|
|align=center|2
|align=center|4:26
|Raleigh, North Carolina, United States
|
|-
| Win
| align=center| 10–3
| Jodie Esquibel
| Decision (unanimous)
| UFC 241
| 
| align=center| 3
| align=center| 5:00
| Anaheim, California, United States
|
|-
| Win
| align=center| 9–3
| Polyana Viana
| Decision (split)
| UFC 235
| 
| align=center| 3
| align=center| 5:00
| Las Vegas, Nevada, United States
|
|-
| Loss
| align=center| 8–3
| Maycee Barber
| TKO (elbows and punches)
| UFC Fight Night: Korean Zombie vs. Rodríguez
| 
| align=center| 2
| align=center| 2:01
| Denver, Colorado, United States
|
|-
| Win
| align=center| 8–2
| Kali Robbins
| TKO (punches)
| Next Level Fight Club 9
| 
| align=center| 1
| align=center| 4:50
| Greenville, North Carolina, United States
|
|-
| Win
| align=center| 7–2
| Celine Haga
| TKO (punches)
| Jackson-Wink Fight Night 3
| 
| align=center| 1
| align=center| 1:16
| Albuquerque, New Mexico, United States
|
|-
| Win
| align=center| 6–2
| Thais Souza
| Decision (unanimous)
| Titan FC 47
| 
| align=center| 3
| align=center| 5:00
| Fort Lauderdale, Florida, United States
|
|-
| Win
| align=center| 5–2
| Andrea Soraluz
| TKO (punches)
| Titan FC 46
| 
| align=center| 2
| align=center| 0:58
| Pembroke Pines, Florida, United States
|
|-
| Win
| align=center| 4–2
| Nicole Smith
| KO (punches)
| Next Level Fight Club 8
| 
| align=center| 1
| align=center| 1:05
| Raleigh, North Carolina, United States
|
|-
| Loss
| align=center| 3–2
| Gillian Robertson
| Submission (rear-naked choke)
| Next Level Fight Club 7
| 
| align=center| 2
| align=center| 4:12
| Raleigh, North Carolina, United States
|
|-
| Win
| align=center| 3–1
| Ronni Nanney
| Decision (unanimous)
| Fight Lab 52
| 
| align=center| 3
| align=center| 5:00
| Charlotte, North Carolina, United States
|
|-
| Win
| align=center| 2–1
| Miki Rogers
| Decision (unanimous)
| Fight Lab 50
| 
| align=center| 3
| align=center| 5:00
| Philadelphia, Pennsylvania, United States
|
|-
| Win
| align=center| 1–1
| Rachel Sazoff
| TKO (punches)
| Dead Serious MMA / XCC: Defiant
| 
| align=center| 1
| align=center| 1:12
| Greensboro, North Carolina, United States
|
|-
| Loss
| align=center| 0–1
| Heather Jo Clark
| Decision (unanimous)
| XFC 26: Night of Champions
| 
| align=center| 3
| align=center| 5:00
| Nashville, Tennessee, United States
|
|-

See also 
 List of female mixed martial artists

References

External links 

 
 

Living people
1992 births
People from Oxford, North Carolina
Mixed martial artists from North Carolina
American female mixed martial artists
Strawweight mixed martial artists
Mixed martial artists utilizing Brazilian jiu-jitsu
American practitioners of Brazilian jiu-jitsu
Female Brazilian jiu-jitsu practitioners
Ultimate Fighting Championship female fighters
21st-century American women